Neutral cholesterol ester hydrolase 1 (NCEH) also known as arylacetamide deacetylase-like 1 (AADACL1) or KIAA1363 is an enzyme that in humans is encoded by the NCEH1 gene.

NCEH is an enzyme located in the endoplasmic reticulum.  NCEH hydrolyzes 2-acetyl monoalkylglycerol ether, as part of an enzymatic pathway regulating the levels of platelet activating factor and lysophospholipids that may be involved in cancer development.

Function 

The enzymatic reaction catalyzed by NCEH is:

 2-acetyl monoalkylglycerol ether → monoalkylglycerol ether

Monoalkylglycerol ethers (MAGEs) can then be converted to lysophospholipids alkyl-lysophosphatidic acid (alkyl-LPA) and alkyl-lysophosphatidylcholine (alkyl-LPC).

Controversial studies by one group also implicate the protein in the hydrolysis of cholesterol esters.  However, loss of the protein in mice selectively reduces 2-acetyl monoalkylglycerol ether activity throughout the body.

Clinical significance 

Evidence suggests a role for NCEH in cancer.  Cancer cell lines contain unusually high levels of the protein.  Reduction of the amount of NCEH1 in cancer cells reduces tumor migration and growth in mice and addition of alkyl-LPA restores these processes.

NCEH can break down organophosphates like the pesticide metabolite chlorpyrifos oxon.  Conversely, enzymatic activity can be inhibited by organophosphates.

Structure 

NCEH is a serine hydrolase that contains an N-terminal transmembrane domain, a central catalytic domain and a lipid-binding domain at its C-terminus.  The protein exists in three isoforms that result from differences in mRNA splicing.  Transcripts encode a protein for isoform a of 448, b of 440 and c of 275 amino acids long.

See also 
 Autotaxin
 phosphatidic acid
 Lysophospholipid receptor
 LPA signaling

References

Further reading 
 
 
 
 
 
 

EC 3.1.1